Statistics of Kuwaiti Premier League in the 1970–71 season.

Overview
Al Qadisiya Kuwait won the championship.

References
RSSSF

1970–71
1970–71 in Asian association football leagues
football